Benedykt Kocot (born 11 April 1954) is a Polish cyclist. He won the Olympic bronze medal in the Tandem at the 1972 Summer Olympics in Munich along with Andrzej Bek.

References 

1954 births
Living people
Polish male cyclists
Olympic cyclists of Poland
Cyclists at the 1972 Summer Olympics
Cyclists at the 1976 Summer Olympics
Cyclists at the 1980 Summer Olympics
Olympic bronze medalists for Poland
Olympic medalists in cycling
People from Opole County
Sportspeople from Opole Voivodeship
Medalists at the 1972 Summer Olympics